Sakla may refer to:

Geography
Places in Estonia:

Sakla, Hiiu County, village in Pühalepa Parish, Hiiu County
Sakla, Saare County, village in Valjala Parish, Saare County

Religion
Saklas or Sakla, another name for Yaldabaoth, the demiurge in Gnosticism